Kunskapskanalen (in English: The Knowledge Channel) is a Swedish language television channel broadcasting educational and factual programming between 9 a.m. and 01 a.m. all days of the week. The channel is operated by Sveriges Television (SVT) and Sveriges Utbildningsradio (UR) and is broadcast by satellite, cable and digital terrestrial television to Sweden as well as by cable to parts of Finland and terrestrially on Åland. Because Denmark and Sweden borders so close at the Øresund Strait, the channel can also be received over DVB-T in Copenhagen.

History
The channel officially started broadcasting on 27 September 2004, initially only between Sundays and Thursdays. Transmissions on Fridays and Saturdays started in January 2006. On weekdays, UR broadcast between 6-7:30 and 9:30-11 and SVT between 7:30-9:30. On weekends UR started at 6, handing over to SVT at 9. UR used in-vision presenters for their programmes until January 2007, when in-vision continuity was abolished. At night a simple caption is broadcast. The channel shares space with Barnkanalen, which broadcasts during the day.

On 1 September 2007 the channel got new broadcasting hours. Barnkanalen took over the 6-7 slot, while Kunskapskanalen extended its broadcasting time to 1 a.m.

In autumn 2008, Barnkanalen took over yet another hour of broadcast time. From 8 August 2008 Barnkanalen would broadcast until 7.30, and from on weekdays, and from 25 August 2008 Kunskapskanalen will commence it broadcasts at 8 p.m. every day of the week. SVT also cuts down on the amount of original programming they produce for Kunskapskanalen, letting the channel rerun programmes from SVT2 instead.

Starting 18 January 2010 Kunskapskanalen will have its broadcast hours dramatically increased when it takes over SVT24's channel space. It will then broadcast from 9 a.m. on Weekdays and from 12 p.m. on Weekends. During the daytime, it will broadcast SVT Forum (previously known as 24 Direkt) which broadcasts seminars, debates and coverage of the Riksdag and the European Parliament.

The channel's first and former logo was inspired by Oscar Reutersvärd's impossible figures.

Logos and identities

See also
 List of documentary television channels

References

External links
 

Television channels in Sweden
Sveriges Television
Documentary television channels
Television channels and stations established in 2004
2004 establishments in Sweden